Baptism for the dead, vicarious baptism or proxy baptism today commonly refers to the religious practice of baptizing a person on behalf of one who is dead—a living person receiving the rite on behalf of a deceased person.

Baptism for the dead is best known as a doctrine of the Latter Day Saint movement, which has practiced it since 1840. It is currently practiced by The Church of Jesus Christ of Latter-day Saints (LDS Church), where it is performed only in dedicated temples, as well as in several other current factions of the movement. Those who practice this rite view baptism as an essential requirement to enter the Kingdom of God, and therefore practice baptism for the dead to offer it by proxy to those who died without the opportunity to receive it. The LDS Church teaches that those who have died may choose to accept or reject the baptisms done on their behalf.

The plainest reading of the Greek text suggests vicarious baptisms performed by the living on behalf of the deceased, but some scholars dispute whether Paul approved of the practice or whether the verse truly refers to an actual physical practice among early Christians. Early heresiologists Epiphanius of Salamis (Panarion 28) and Chrysostom (Homilies 40) attributed the practice respectively to the Cerinthians and to the Marcionites, whom they identified as heretical "Gnostic" groups, while Ambrosiaster and Tertullian affirmed that the practice was legitimate and found among the New Testament Christians (though Tertullian later recanted his original beliefs in his later life as he became associated with Montanism). The practice was forbidden by the Councils of Carthage in the last decade of the fourth century AD, and is therefore not practiced in modern mainstream Christianity, whether Oriental Orthodox, Eastern Orthodox, Roman Catholic, or any traditional Protestant churches.

Practice

Church of Jesus Christ of Latter-day Saints

In the practice of the LDS Church, a living person, acting as proxy, is baptized by immersion on behalf of a deceased person of the same sex. Baptism for the dead is an ordinance of the church, performed only in temples, and is based on the belief that baptism is required for entry into the Kingdom of God.

Community of Christ
Some members of the early Reorganized Church of Jesus Christ of Latter Day Saints (RLDS Church; now known as the Community of Christ) also believed in baptism for the dead, but it was never officially sanctioned by that organization and was considered highly controversial.

At a 1970 church world conference, a revelation and two letters written by Joseph Smith appertaining to baptism for the dead were removed as sections and placed in the appendix of the RLDS Church's Doctrine and Covenants; at a 1990 world conference, the three documents were removed entirely from the RLDS Church's scriptural canon.

Other churches of the Latter-day Saint Movement
In the Restoration Branches movement, which broke from the RLDS Church in the 1980s, the question of baptism for the dead is at best unsettled. Many adherents reject the validity of the ordinance completely. Others regard it as a legitimate rite, the permission for which has been withdrawn by God ever since the Latter Day Saints failed to complete the Nauvoo Temple within the specified time frame.

Other Latter Day Saint denominations that accept baptism for the dead include the Church of Jesus Christ of Latter Day Saints (Strangite), The Church of Jesus Christ (Cutlerite), and the Righteous Branch (Christ's Church). The Strangite Church performed baptisms for the dead during the 1840s in Voree, Wisconsin, and later during the 1850s on Beaver Island, Michigan. In each case, the practice was authorized on the basis of what James J. Strang reported as a revelation. The question of whether the Strangite Church still practices proxy baptism is an open one, but belief is considered orthodox.

Other Christian churches
As part of their sacraments, the New Apostolic Church and the Old Apostolic Church also practice baptism for the dead, as well as Communion and Sealing to the Departed. In this practice a proxy or substitute is baptised in the place of an unknown number of deceased persons. According to NAC and OAC doctrine the deceased do not enter the body of the substitute.

Early Christianity
Latter-day Saint scholar John A. Tvedtnes says: "Baptism for the dead was performed by the dominant church until forbidden by the sixth canon of the Council of Carthage (397). Some of the smaller sects, however, continued the practice." He does not give the text of that canon, which, if it is included in Canon 18 of The Code of Canons of the African Church, reads: "It also seemed good that the Eucharist should not be given to the bodies of the dead. For it is written: 'Take, Eat', but the bodies of the dead can neither 'take' nor 'eat'. Nor let the ignorance of the presbyters baptize those who are dead."

Epiphanius of Salamis (between 310–320 – 403) reported that he had heard it said that, among followers of Cerinthus, if one of them died before baptism, another was baptized in that person's name:

John Chrysostom (c. 347–407) mockingly attributes to the Marcionites of the late 4th century a similar practice: if one of their followers who was being prepared for baptism died before receiving baptism, the dead person's corpse was addressed with the question whether he wished to be baptized, whereupon another answered affirmatively and was baptized for the dead person.

1 Corinthians 15:29
In the context of insisting that "in Christ shall all be made alive .. Christ the firstfruits; afterward they that are Christ's", Paul wrote in : "Else what shall they do which are baptized for the dead, if the dead rise not at all? why are they then baptized for the dead?" Different views have been expressed on the meaning of the phrase "baptized for the dead", and on whether Paul gave his approval to the practice.

Meanings of the verb baptizein
The Greek verb in Paul's phrase "baptized for the dead" is baptizein, which in Jewish Greek has a wider reference than "baptism", applying primarily to the masculine noun baptismos "ritual washing" The verb occurs four times in the Septuagint in the context of ritual washing, baptismos: Judith cleansing herself from menstrual impurity, Naaman washing seven times to be cleansed from leprosy, etc. In the New Testament only, the verb baptizein can also relate to the neuter noun baptisma "baptism", a neologism unknown in the Septuagint and other pre-Christian Jewish texts. This broadness in the meaning of baptizein is reflected in English Bibles rendering "wash", where Jewish ritual washing is meant, for example in Mark 7:4, which states that the Pharisees "except they wash (Greek "baptize"), they do not eat", and "baptize" where baptisma, the new Christian rite, is intended. The older ritual washing use of baptizein is relevant in the context of funerals since any Jew coming into contact with the dead body must undertake ritual washing. During the Second Temple and early Rabbinical period the regulations on "ritual washing" (Greek masculine noun baptismos) expanded and multiplied. This is documented in the Halakhah Tractate Yadayim and Dead Sea Scrolls Peter Leithart (2007) suggests that Paul's comment "why do they.." is an analogy between baptism (i.e. neuter concept noun baptisma) with Jewish ritual washing (i.e. masculine concrete noun baptismos) for contact with the dead following the Mosaic regulations in Numbers 19. The phrase "ritually washed for the dead" does not occur in intertestamental literature, but a possibly related idea of prayer for the dead occurs in 2 Maccabees. Since the New Testament idea of "baptism" (Greek baptisma), the rite of baptism, is not mentioned in the verse, it is open to interpretation whether the verb baptizein refers to "ritual washing" (Greek baptismos) or "the rite of baptism" (Greek baptisma) or is an analogy between both.

Meaning of the phrase
Tertullian's (155-220 AD) earliest writings affirm the assumption that the Corinthians practiced vicarious baptisms on behalf of the deceased and seem to affirm the legitimacy of the practice. In one of his first written works, On the Resurrection of the Flesh, he writes "Now it is certain that they adopted this (practice) with such a presumption that made them suppose that the vicarious baptism (in question) would be beneficial to the flesh of another in anticipation of the resurrection." Tertullian much later, however, (around the time that he begins to display Montanist influences), reinterprets the Corinthians passage and argues, instead, against baptisms performed for the dead. In his book, Against Marcion, he says that the practice ("whatever it may have been") to which Paul alluded in  witnessed to belief in bodily resurrection, something that Marcion denied, and that, "baptized for the dead" must mean "baptized for the body," which is destined to die and rise again.

Ambrosiaster, the author of a commentary on Paul's epistles, written between 366 and 384 AD, also affirmed the practice among the earliest Christians, noting "that some people were at that time [New Testament period] being baptized for the dead because they were afraid that someone who was not baptized would either not rise at all or else rise merely in order to be condemned."

John Chrysostom (347-407 AD), opposed to a literal reading of 1 Corinthians 15:29, explained Paul's mention of people being "baptized for the dead" as a reference to the profession of faith they made in their own future resurrection before being baptized.

In this interpretation, the phrase is closely linked with what Paul says immediately afterwards of the suffering that he himself faces and is enabled to endure precisely because of his faith in his resurrection. This interpretation is similar to that of John Chrysostom.

Others interpret the phrase as referring to simple baptism of an individual. Martin Luther regarded it as a practice of being baptized above (the first of the meanings of the preposition ὑπέρ, generally translated in this passage as for) the tombs of the dead. John Calvin saw it as a reference to being baptized when close to death.

The simplest reading of the text sees the phrase as referring to vicarious baptism on behalf of dead people performed in the belief that the dead were thereby benefitted in some way. This belief is put forward as the reason why, when Paul compares the Corinthians' experience to that of the Israelites in crossing the Red Sea and being fed on manna, he insists that the Israelites were not thereby prevented from sinning.

Possible approval by Paul
The HarperCollins Study Bible acknowledges the plain reading of the text that Paul was literally speaking about baptisms being performed on behalf of the deceased, and writes, "why the Corinthians practiced baptism on behalf of the dead is unknown; see also 2 Macc 12.44-45." The 2 Maccabees passage speaks about the similar practice of performing sacrifices for the dead among Intertestamental Jews. The evangelical Tyndale Bible Dictionary, instead, concludes that Paul probably did not approve the practice of baptism for the dead. He refers to its practitioners as "they", not as "you" (the Corinthian Christians to whom he wrote). The note in the Catholic New American Bible is more cautious: "Baptized for the dead: this practice is not further explained here, nor is it necessarily mentioned with approval, but Paul cites it as something in their experience that attests in one more way to belief in the resurrection." In this, it stays close to what Tertullian wrote in the year 207 or 208, when he said that Paul's only aim in alluding to the practice of baptism for the dead, "whatever it may have been", was "that he might all the more firmly insist upon the resurrection of the body, in proportion as they who were vainly baptized for the dead resorted to the practice from their belief of such a resurrection."

Other views
Elaine Pagels (1992) seeks to explain 1 Corinthians as having reference to the Valentinian sect later numbered among the "Gnostic" heresies. However, Pagels' view of Paul's epistles is not supported by other scholars.

Joel R. White argues from the context of the passage that 1 Cor 15:29 is referring to the apostles, especially Apollos and Paul himself.

LDS Church doctrine

Members of the LDS Church believe that baptism is a prerequisite for entry into the kingdom of God as stated by Jesus in : "Except that a man be born of water and of the Spirit, he cannot enter into the kingdom of God" (KJV).

The LDS Church teaches that performing baptisms for the dead allows this saving ordinance to be offered on behalf of those who have died without accepting or knowing Jesus Christ or his teachings during their mortal lives. It is taught that this is the method by which all who have lived upon the earth will have the opportunity to receive baptism and to thereby enter the Kingdom of God.

Among other Biblical references, Latter-day Saints cite Peter's statements that Jesus preached to the spirits of the dead (KJV 1 Peter 3:19; 4:6) as evidence that God in his justice provides an opportunity for the deceased to hear and accept the gospel, if they don't receive that chance in mortality. As Peter affirmed in Acts 2:37–38, the next step after acceptance of the gospel is baptism for the remission of sins, which "doth also now save us" (KJV 1 Peter 3:21).

The LDS Church teaches that those in the afterlife who have been baptized by proxy are free to accept or reject the ordinance done on their behalf. Baptism on behalf of a deceased individual is not binding if that individual chooses to reject it in the afterlife.

Any member of the LDS Church, male or female, beginning in the year they turn 12 years old and holds a current temple recommend may act as a proxy in this ordinance. Men must also hold the Aaronic priesthood prior to entering the temple. Men act as proxy for deceased men, and women as proxy for deceased women. The concept of a spiritual proxy is compared by some in the LDS Church to the belief that Jesus acted as proxy for every human when he atoned for the sins of the world.

Historically, only adult male holders of the Melchizedek priesthood who had undergone the endowment ordinance were permitted to baptize others as proxies for the dead. In 2018, this policy was changed to allow boys who hold the Aaronic priesthood office of priest, generally between 15 and 18-years old, to officiate in baptisms for the dead.

Modern origin
According to the LDS Church, the practice of baptism for the dead is based on a revelation received by the prophet Joseph Smith. Smith first taught the doctrine at the funeral sermon of a deceased member of the church, Seymour Brunson.

LDS Church scripture expands further upon this doctrine and states that such baptisms are to be performed in temples. Vicarious baptism is performed in connection with other vicarious ordinances in temples of the LDS Church, such as the endowment and celestial marriage.

Initially, women could be baptized for dead men, and vice versa; this, however, was changed in order to ensure that the person being baptized for a dead man could also be ordained on their behalf to the priesthood.

Genealogy and baptism
The LDS Church teaches that deceased persons who have not accepted, or had the opportunity to accept, the gospel of Christ in this life will have such opportunity in the afterlife. The belief is that as all must follow Jesus Christ, they must also receive all the ordinances that a living person is expected to receive, including baptism. For this reason, members of the LDS Church are encouraged to research their genealogy. This research is then used as the basis for church performing temple ordinances for as many deceased persons as possible. As a part of these efforts, Latter-day Saints have performed temple ordinances on behalf of a number of high-profile people, including the Founding Fathers of the United States, U.S. Presidents, most Catholic popes, John Wesley, Christopher Columbus, Adolf Hitler, Joan of Arc, Genghis Khan, Joseph Stalin, and Gautama Buddha.

While members of the LDS Church consider vicarious ordinances for the deceased an act of compassionate service, some non-members have taken offense. Sensitive to the issue of proxy baptizing for non-Mormons not related to church members, the church in recent years has published a general policy of performing temple ordinances only for relatives.  For example, the church is in the process of removing sensitive names (such as Jewish Holocaust victims) from its International Genealogical Index (IGI). D. Todd Christofferson of the church's Presidency of the Seventy stated that removing the names is an "ongoing, labor intensive process requiring name-by-name research .... When the Church is made aware of documented concerns, action is taken .... Plans are underway to refine this process." The LDS Church keeps records of the temple ordinances performed for deceased persons; however, FamilySearch, a web application for accessing the church's genealogical databases, shows information on temple ordinances only to registered LDS Church members and not to non-members.

In 2008, a directive from the Vatican Congregation for the Clergy directed Catholic dioceses to prevent the LDS Church from "microfilming and digitizing information" contained in Catholic sacramental registers so that those whose names were contained therein would not be subjected to vicarious Mormon baptism. Earlier, the Vatican had declared that Mormon baptisms were invalid.

Controversy

Jewish Holocaust victims

The LDS Church performs vicarious baptisms for individuals regardless of their race, sex, creed, religion, or morality. Some members of the LDS Church have been baptized for both victims and perpetrators of The Holocaust, including Anne Frank and Adolf Hitler, contrary to modern church policy. Some Jewish Holocaust survivors and some Jewish organizations have objected to this practice.

Since the early 1990s, the LDS Church has urged members to submit the names of only their own ancestors for ordinances, and to request permission of surviving family members of people who have died within the past 95 years. Hundreds of thousands of improperly submitted names not adhering to this policy have been removed from the records of the church. Church apostle Boyd K. Packer has stated the church has been open about its practice of using public records to further temple ordinance work.

Despite the guidelines, some members of the church have submitted names without adequate permission. In December 2002, independent researcher Helen Radkey published a report showing that, following a 1995 promise from the church to remove Jewish Holocaust victims from its International Genealogical Index, the church's database included the names of about 19,000 who had a 40 to 50 percent chance "to be Holocaust victims ... in Russia, Poland, France, and Austria." Genealogist Bernard Kouchel searched the International Genealogical Index, and discovered that many well known Jews had been vicariously baptized, including Maimonides, Albert Einstein, and Irving Berlin, without family permission.

Church official D. Todd Christofferson told The New York Times that the church expends massive amounts of resources attempting to purge improperly submitted names, but that it is not feasible to expect the church to find each and every last one, and that the agreement in 1995 did not place this type of responsibility on the centralized church leadership.

Jewish groups, including the Simon Wiesenthal Center, spoke out against the vicarious baptism of Holocaust perpetrators and victims in the mid-1990s and again in the 2000s when they discovered the practice, which they consider insensitive to the living and the dead, was continuing. The associate dean of the Simon Wiesenthal Center, Abraham Cooper, complained that infamous figures such as Adolf Hitler and Eva Braun appeared on LDS genealogical records: "Whether official or not, the fact remains that this is exactly the kind of activity that enraged and hurt, really, so many victims of the Holocaust and caused alarm in the Jewish community."

In 2008, the American Gathering of Jewish Holocaust Survivors announced that, since church members had repeatedly violated previous agreements, it would no longer negotiate with the church to try to prevent vicarious baptism. Speaking on the anniversary of Kristallnacht, Ernest Michel, a Holocaust survivor who reported on the Nuremberg Trials, speaking as the honorary chairman of the American Gathering of Holocaust Survivors, called on the LDS Church to "implement a mechanism to undo what [they] have done", and declared that the LDS Church had repeatedly violated their agreements, and that talks with Mormon leaders were now ended. Jewish groups, he said, would now turn to the court of public opinion for justice. Michel called the practice a revision of history that plays into the hands of Holocaust deniers, stating: "They tell me, that my parents' Jewishness has not been altered but ... 100 years from now, how will they be able to guarantee that my mother and father of blessed memory who lived as Jews and were slaughtered by Hitler for no other reason than they were Jews, will someday not be identified as Mormon victims of the Holocaust?"

Church officials, in response, stated that the church does not teach that vicarious baptisms coerce deceased persons to become Mormons, nor does the church add those names to its list of church members. Church officials have also stated that, in accordance with the 1995 agreement, it has removed more than 300,000 names of Jewish Holocaust victims from its databases, as well as subsequently removing names later identified by Jewish groups. Church officials stated in 2008 that a new version of the FamilySearch application had been developed and was being implemented in an effort to prevent the submission of Holocaust victim names for temple ordinances.

In February 2012, the issue re-emerged after it was found that the parents of Holocaust survivor and Jewish rights advocate Simon Wiesenthal were added to the genealogical database. Shortly afterward, news stories announced that Anne Frank had been baptized by proxy for the ninth time, at the Santo Domingo Dominican Republic Temple.

See also

 Bariah
 Ancestor liberation
 Criticism of the Latter Day Saint movement
 Genealogical Society of Utah
 Posthumous marriage in Mormonism
 Sealing power

Notes

References

 
 
 
 
 
 
 
 . Digital reprint by FairMormon

Further reading

 
 
 .

External links

 Rites: Baptism for the Dead, Featured Religions and Beliefs: Mormonism, at the BBC's Religion and Ethics portal
 Baptism for the Dead, Schaff–Herzog Encyclopedia of Religious Knowledge, at Christian Classics Ethereal Library
 Recipient of baptism: Baptism of the dead, in "Baptism" entry of the Catholic Encyclopedia

1840 in Christianity
Baptism
First Epistle to the Corinthians
Genealogy and the Church of Jesus Christ of Latter-day Saints
Latter Day Saint ordinances, rituals, and symbolism
Latter Day Saint temple practices
Latter Day Saint terms
Mormonism-related controversies
Mormonism and death